Beyond the Horizon may refer to:

 Beyond the Horizon (play), a play by Eugene O'Neill
 Beyond the Horizon (film), a 2005 Myanmar film
 Beyond the Horizon, a 1942 science fiction novel by Robert A. Heinlein
 Beyond the Horizon, a 1960 Bulgarian film directed by Zahari Zhandov
 Beyond the Horizon, a 2009 docudrama film with a screenplay co-written by Leonard Mlodinow
 Beyond the Horizon (Más Allá del Horizonte), an Argentine telenovela
 Beyond the Horizon (novel), a 1995 novel by Amma Darko

In music:
 Beyond the Horizon (People in Planes album), an album by People in Planes
 Beyond the Horizon, an album by The Marshall Tucker Band
 "Beyond the Horizon", a song by Bob Dylan from Modern Times
 "Beyond the Horizon", a song by Dissection from Reinkaos
 Beyond the Horizon, a 25-minutes piece for brass band, written by Bertrand Moren for the Brass Band Treize Etoiles (Switzerland)
 Silk Road Journeys: Beyond the Horizon, a 2004 album by Yo-Yo Ma and the Silk Road Ensemble